Marián Vajda was the defending champion, but did not participate this year.

Marc Rosset won the title, defeating Guillermo Pérez Roldán 6–4, 7–5 in the final.

Seeds

  Alberto Mancini (first round)
  Sergi Bruguera (first round)
  Andrés Gómez (second round)
  Guillermo Pérez Roldán (final)
  Goran Ivanišević (first round)
  Marcelo Filippini (second round)
  Guy Forget (first round)
  Bruno Orešar (first round)

Draw

Finals

Top half

Bottom half

External links
 ATP main draw

Singles